Ankit Maini (born 6 December 1989) is an Indian cricketer. He made his Twenty20 debut for Himachal Pradesh in the 2018–19 Syed Mushtaq Ali Trophy on 21 February 2019. He made his List A debut on 2 October 2019, for Himachal Pradesh in the 2019–20 Vijay Hazare Trophy.

References

External links
 

1989 births
Living people
Indian cricketers
Himachal Pradesh cricketers
Place of birth missing (living people)